Adiaratou Iglesias Forneiro (born 6 February 1999), also known as Adiaratou Iglesias and nicknamed "Adi", is a Spanish track and field athlete.

In June 2019, during the Athletics Grand Prix in Grosseto, she broke a national record for Spain in the T12 category of 100m at 12.42 seconds (despite an opposing wind factor of -1.8); she also won the 200m with 25.78 seconds.  These times qualified her for the World Para Athletics Championships held in Dubai where she earned the silver medal and set another record for Spain in the 100m T12 clocking 11.99.

Due to albinism, Adiaratou has 10% eyesight which increases to around 20% with glasses.  While she uses reference points on the track to help guide her, she also employs the assistance of a guide during races.

At the 2020 Summer Paralympics, Iglesias won a gold medal in the women's 100m T13 and a silver medal in the women's 400m T13.

Early life 
Adiaratou was born in Bamako, Mali in 1999.  In 2010, she left Mali primarily due to the country's superstition surrounding albinism, and moved to Logroño, Spain where her brother and sister-in-law were living.  As a result of alleged abuse in the home, Adiaratou was placed in foster care where she remained for 2 years.  She has since been adopted and currently resides in Lugo, Spain with her foster family.

References

External links
 
 
 

1999 births
Living people
Spanish athletes
Sportspeople from Logroño
People from Bamako
People with albinism
Adoptees
Athletes (track and field) at the 2020 Summer Paralympics
20th-century Spanish women
21st-century Spanish women